KPOV-FM (88.9 FM) is an American non-commercial educational radio station in Bend, Oregon, broadcasting at 1100 watts on 88.9 MHz.  KPOV-FM airs a variety of syndicated news and talk programming such as Democracy Now!, Free Speech Radio News, along with locally originated programming, including the local community affairs program The Point.

On October 4, 2012, the Federal Communications Commission granted KPOV a construction permit to increase power to 1,100 watts on 88.9 FM.

See also
List of community radio stations in the United States

References

External links
KPOV official website
 
FCC construction permit
Calling All Cowboys radio program

POV-LP
POV-LP
Community radio stations in the United States
Radio stations established in 1984
1984 establishments in Oregon